Territory located in present-day Benin.

English: Whydah; 

(Dates in italics indicate de facto continuation of office)

Sources
 http://www.rulers.org/benitrad.html

See also
Benin
Fon people
List of rulers of the Fon state of Alada

Lists of office-holders

Fon people
Kings of Dahomey
Savi Hweda
Lists of African rulers